Zaprochilinae is a subfamily of bush-crickets found in Australia; the type genus is Zaprochilus.

Description
The head is prognathous, the shape of the body is rod-shaped similar to stick insects. They live and feed on flowers. There are winged, short-winged and wingless forms (e.g. females of Kawanaphila).

Genera
The Orthoptera Species File includes:
 Anthophiloptera: monotypic  Anthophiloptera dryas Rentz & Clyne, 1983
 Kawanaphila Rentz, 1993
 Windbalea Rentz, 1993
 Zaprochilus  Caudell, 1909

References

External links
 
 

Orthoptera subfamilies
Orthoptera of Australia
Tettigoniidae